The Attar  are a Muslim community and caste found in the state of Maharashtra and state of Andhra pradesh in India. This community has no connection with the Attarwala of Gujarat, other than both communities at one time having been involved in the manufacture of ittars (perfumes).

Origin
The community's name comes from ittar, the Arabic word for perfume. Attar originally came from Turkey, Iran and Afghanistan in about 1450. They are now found in western Maharashtra, particularly in the districts of Nasik, Pune, Satara, Ahmadnagar, Sholapur, Kolhapur, Dhulia and the city of Mumbai. Also in Andhra Pradesh state in Hindupur, Penukonda, Kadiri in south India .

Traces of the Attar community are also found in modern Pakistani Punjab, Indian Punjab and Haryana. Historically, Attar caste has its roots with «KHING»खिँग community, whose small center can be found in Hindupur in state of Andhra Pradesh in India. Maharaj Chanan Shah, a follower of Sufism was the head founder of the «KHING»खिँग community. Present Shaik Attar Athiq Ahmed popularly known as  Attar Athiq Bhai is Crown Prince and Head to House of Attar in  Hindupur

Attars are rulers of West parts of Afghanistan and east part of Turkey. After migrating to India Attar community started dealing with manufacturing of perfumes and smell sticks etc. Currently only few families are dealing with their family business. Some families have moved abroad and settled in USA, Canada and Europe and some in other states of India.

In 1658 AD Attar Community migrated to south India in Kolar district in Karnataka State   these Attars share blood relation with Hyder Ali father of Tippu Sultan Tiger of Mysore ruler of Mysore Kingdom. Along with business . Attars had small kingdoms under the rule of Mysore Kingdom. After martyrdom of Tippu Sultan in August 24 1799, Head of Attar Family then Attar Kareem Sab along with his younger brothers migrated to a small village near to Hindupur town.

Attar Kareem Sab Continued to live imperial and aristocratic as their ancestors and followed their family traditional business. After Attar Kareem sab his elder son Attar Musa Miyan Sab became his Successor. Attar Musa Sab during his regime made his elder son Attar Miyan Sab as Head of House of Attar.In 1956 elder son of Attar Miyan Sab Attar Allahbakash Sab moved to Hindupur town, Attar Miyan Sab declared his elder son as the next hier to House of Attar.

Present circumstances
After holding place as head to House of Attar Attar Allahbakash Sab started and registered Kola Brand Agarbatti on 12 February 1962 that was first product House of Attar has registered officially. After death of Attar Allahbakash Sab in 1990 on April 14th his youngest son Attar Idrees Ahmed became head to House of Attar. On 22 March 2022 Shaik Attar Athiq Ahmed (Attar Athiq Bhai) elder son of Attar Idrees Ahmed has been Crowned as Crown Prince and head to House of Attar.

The Attars have set up their own caste association, the Attar Council, which acts as a community welfare organization and pressure group. They are Tablighi or Sunni Muslims, and now fairly orthodox. Mostly now Attar have involved all businesses, active politics, etc. There is no concept of clan exogamy, and the community practices both parallel cousin and cross-cousin marriages.

See also
Attarwala

References

Muslim communities of Maharashtra
Indian castes
Perfumery
Perfumers
Incense in India